San Sebastián metropolitan area is an area in the province of Gipuzkoa (Spain) which extends into France. It includes, besides the city  of San Sebastián, a number of nearby municipalities, some of them bordering. Its total population is 405,099 inhabitants, with its extension of 372.86 square kilometres. It is the 19 th urban agglomeration of Spain in terms of population.

Municipalities of the metropolitan area

Metropolitan areas of Spain
San Sebastián
Transborder agglomerations